Nick Burd is an American novelist.

Career
Nick Burd attended the University of Iowa and received his MFA from The New School.

In 2009, Burd published his first novel, The Vast Fields of Ordinary, which received many positive reviews. The Vast Fields of Ordinary won the American Library Association's Stonewall Book Award in the Children's and Young Adult Literature category.  The novel was also a finalist for a Lambda Literary Award for LGBT Children's/Young Adult literature.  The New York Times listed The Vast Fields of Ordinary as one of the most notable books of 2009.  The novel also received a positive review from The New York Times.<ref>Ned Vizzine: [https://web.archive.org/web/20110622094225/https://www.nytimes.com/2009/07/12/books/review/Vizzini-t.html Young Adult: Inside the Outside], nytimes.com, July 10, 2009</ref> Publishers Weekly called The Vast Fields of Ordinary "deceptively quiet" and "fresh" and said that Burd was "an author to watch."

Burd was also listed by Out as one of its "OUT 100," a list of 100 people who made important contributions to LGBTQ culture and politics in 2009.

He is working on his second novel.
 
Since writing The Vast Fields of Ordinary, Burd has worked in the entertainment industry as a creative director, winning two Clio Awards and a Shorty Award for his work on the digital campaigns for BoJack Horseman and Daredevil.

Bibliography

 The Vast Fields of Ordinary'' (2009)

References

21st-century American novelists
American male novelists
Living people
LGBT African Americans
Novelists from Iowa
African-American novelists
American LGBT novelists
University of Iowa alumni
Place of birth missing (living people)
American young adult novelists
21st-century American male writers
Stonewall Book Award winners
21st-century African-American writers
African-American male writers
1980 births